Ryan Tuerck (born April 10, 1985) is an American professional drifter from Derry, New Hampshire who currently competes in the U.S. Formula Drift series in his Toyota Corolla Hatchback for Rain-X and Nitto Tire.

Formula Drift Biography 

Ryan is a leading social influencer and a champion in the making. With a career 14 podiums, he has shown winning potential when he’s behind the wheel of the right car. In 2020, he joins the Papadakis Racing organization, where he drives the Toyota-backed Rain-X / Nitto Tire Toyota Corolla Hatchback.

The driver’s "bro" type personality, commitment to the sport’s grassroots, and wealth to buy camera equipment have brought him a social fanbase of just over a million followers. Notable projects include the eponymous YouTube series Tuerck’d, Network A’s Drift Garage and the Gumout Blackout series. A build series on a Ferrari engine-swapped Toyota 86 known as the Toyota GT4586 has generated nearly 70-million impressions since its 2016 launch.

Tuerck started his motorsport career on two wheels, racing AMA motocross through his early teens. He developed a passion for drifting at age 16 while learning to control rear-wheel drive cars on the snowy winter roads near his family’s New England home.

In addition to campaigning a full Formula Drift season, he maintains a full demo and appearance calendar. A New Hampshire native, Tuerck now makes his home in Los Angeles.

History 
For as long as he can remember, Ryan has loved Extreme Sports, and at a young age he became interested in BMX and Motocross. At the age of nine, his father bought him his first dirt bike, and by ten years old he started racing motocross. As he progressed through the ranks of amateur motocross he had countless podium finishes. The highlight of Tuerck’s amateur career was placing 7th in the nation, at Lorreta Lynn’s Amateur Nationals. At 16, he received his professional license from the American Motocross Association (AMA), and by 17, Ryan earned the opportunity to travel Canada, to race in the professional Canadian Nationals. Some of the highlights of his professional career included, placing 5th in the 125cc Canadian Nationals Championship, as well as qualifying for Budds Creek, and Unadilla in the AMA Motocross Nationals. Though Ryan’s motocross career looked promising, he was forced to stop due to personal reasons.

Ryan was gaining a lot of interest in cars since he turned 16. When he stopped racing, he bought his first car, a 1990 Ford Mustang. At night, feeling the need to challenge himself he would get his car sideways pulling out of stop signs and slide around in empty parking lots near his home. After having the Mustang for a year, Ryan found out on the internet that sliding your car around or “Drifting” was actually a real sport. Ryan immediately sold his Mustang to buy a lighter, and better handling Nissan 240sx. He upgraded the suspension and bought a 2-way LSD for the car to help it drift. In 2003, Ryan went to his first formal event at Raceway Park in Englishtown, NJ, where he met future “Drift Alliance” teammates Tony Angelo, Chris Forsberg, and Vaughn Gittin Jr. Ryan did very well at first winning the competition. Ryan continued to do very well everywhere he went and constantly spending all his money upgrading his car.

Before joining Formula D, he completed successfully in Drift Mania Canadian Championship.  In 2005, Ryan Competed in Two Rounds or Formula Drift where he did well enough to get noticed by a few sponsors. In 2006, Ryan competed in the entire Formula Drift series with help from his Drift Alliance brothers, Cooper Tires, Discount Tire, and 240sxMotoring. Ryan did exceptional in his rookie season with a 6th-place finish at the Sonoma round. In 2007, Ryan moved to California with his Drift Alliance Teammate Tony Angelo and started “Team Snakebite” together and ran the whole Formula Drift season independently with help from sponsors which resulted in Ryan finishing the season 15th in points. In 2008, Ryan was picked up by Gardella Racing and drove a 2007 Pontiac Solstice GXP sponsored by Gardella Racing, Mobil 1, GM Racing, and Maxxis Tires. Following in 2009, Ryan won first place on podium in Round 1 at Long Beach and again later in the year at Irwindale and in 2010 came 3rd in series points. In 2011, Gardella retired the Solstice from Ryan, picked up Red Bull as a lead sponsor and drove the 2011 Mobil 1/Red Bull Chevrolet Camaro in which he finished 15th that year. The 2012 season began with a shuffle of sponsorships, Ryan left Gardella Racing for personal reasons, and was picked up by Retaks before the first event at long beach. He finished off the season in fifth after a third-place finish at Irwindale.

Ryan is also in part of a missile drifting group (along with many of his drift alliance brothers) based out of Englishtown, NJ called "Blood Masters".

For the 2022 Formula Drift Season, Tuerck is driving a Toyota Corolla Hatchback built by Papadakis Racing. He is sponsored by Rain-X, Nitto Tire, and Toyota Racing.

Currently Race Cars and Projects

Drift Cars
As of November 2020, Ryan Tuerck drives 3 Drift Cars and has another 1 in development.

Formula Drift Pro Car
His current Pro Car is a Toyota Corolla Hatchback built by Papadakis Racing. The title sponsors are, Rain-X and Nitto Tire. In his first season with this new chassis podiumed 4 times with a win in Texas

GT4586
His previous SEMA build, the GT4586 is still doing demos and was at the Goodwood Festival of Speed.

Papadakis Demo Car
He is also the driver of the Papadakis Racing Toyota Corolla Hatchback Demo Car that was most recently at the Gridlife Alpine Horizon Festival.

East Coast Car
He is also working on an "East Coast" Toyota 86, that was originally the "$25k Baja 86". Both builds have a series posted on YouTube.

Other Builds

Formula Supra
He is working on the "Formula Supra" Toyota Supra. It is a 2020 GR Supra with a V10 Judd engine, mostly focused on hill climb and time attack

Formula Drift Results

2022 
 Formula D Championship - 3rd Overall (573 pts)
 Round 1: Streets Of Long Beach (Long Beach) Finished 1st
 Round 2: Road to the Championship (Atlanta) Top 8
 Round 3: Scorched (Orlando) Top 16
 Round 4: The Gauntlet (Englishtown) Top 8
 Round 5: Crossroads (St. Louis) Finished 2nd
 Round 6: Throwdown (Monroe) Top 8
 Round 7: Elevated (Grantsville) Top 32
 Round 8: Title Fight (Irwindale) Finished 2nd

2021 
 Formula D Championship - 6th Overall (537 pts)
 Round 1: Road to the Championship (Atlanta) Top 16
 Round 2: Scorched (Orlando) Top 32
 Round 3: The Gauntlet (Englishtown) Finished 4th
 Round 4: Borderlands (Erie) Top 16
 Round 5: Throwdown (Monroe) Finished 2nd
 Round 6: Crossroads (St. Louis) Finished 2nd
 Round 7: Streets Of Long Beach (Long Beach) Top 16
 Round 8: Title Fight (Irwindale) Top 8

2020 
 Formula D Championship - 3rd Overall (484 pts)
 Round 1: Crossroads (St. Louis) Finished 2nd
 Round 2: Crossroads (St. Louis) Finished 3rd
 Round 3: Throwdown (Monroe) Top 16
 Round 4: Throwdown (Monroe) Finished 3rd
 Round 5: Showdown (Texas) Finished 1st
 Round 6: Showdown (Texas) Top 8
 Round 7: Title Fight (Irwindale) Top 16
 Round 8: Title Fight (Irwindale) Top 16

2019 
 Formula D Championship - 5th Overall (443 pts)
 Round 1: Streets of Long Beach (Long Beach) Top 32 (Qualified 7th)
 Round 2: Scorched (Orlando) Top 16 (Qualified 15th)
 Round 3: Road to the Championship (Atlanta) Finished 2nd (Qualified 3rd)
 Round 4: The Gauntlet (New Jersey) Finished 1st (Qualified 9th)
 Round 5: Throwdown (Monroe) Top 16 (Qualified 3rd)
 Round 6: Crossroads (St. Louis) Final 4 (Qualified 6th)
 Round 7: Showdown (Texas) Top 8 (Qualified 29th)
 Round 8: Title Fight (Irwindale) Top 8 (Qualified 3rd)

2018 
 Formula D Championship - 6th Overall (380 pts)
 Round 1: Streets of Long Beach (Long Beach) Top 8 (Qualified 8th)
 Round 2: Scorched (Orlando) Final 4 (Qualified 6th)
 Round 3: Road to the Championship (Atlanta) Top 16 (Qualified 20th)
 Round 4: The Gauntlet (New Jersey) Top 16 (Qualified 12th)
 Round 5: Throwdown (Monroe) Finished 2nd (Qualified 7th)
 Round 6: Crossroads (St. Louis) Top 32 (Qualified 12th)
 Round 7: Showdown (Texas) Top 8 (Qualified 5th)
 Round 8: Title Fight (Irwindale) Top 16 (Qualified 5th)

2017 
 Formula D Championship - 9th Overall (340 pts)

2016 
 Formula D Championship - 9th Overall (322 pts)

2015
 Formula D Championship - 4th Overall (367 pts)

2014 
 Formula D Championship - 12th Overall (235 pts)

2013 
 Formula D Championship - 14th Overall (291 pts)

2012 
 Formula D Championship - 5th Overall (465.50 pts)
 Formula D ~ Best Style Award
 Placed Top 16 at Formula Drift Round 1, Streets of Long Beach, CA (Qualified 1st)
 Placed Top 16 at Formula Drift Round 2, Road Atlanta Raceway, GA (Qualified 24th)
 Placed Top 8 at Formula Drift Round 3, Palm Beach International Raceway, FL (Qualified 11th)
 Placed Top 16 at Formula Drift Round 4, The Wall, NJ (Qualified 11th)
 Placed 2nd at Formula Drift Round 5, Evergreen Speedway, WA (Qualified 15th)
 Placed Top 16 at Formula Drift Round 6, Las Vegas Motor Speedway, NV (Qualified 14th)
 Placed 3rd at Formula Drift Round 7, Irwindale Speedway, CA (Qualified 6th)

2011 
 Formula D Championship - 7th Overall (437 pts)
 Placed Top 8 at Formula Drift Round 1, Streets of Long Beach, CA (Qualified 10th)
 Placed Top 16 at Formula Drift Round 2, Road Atlanta Raceway, GA (Qualified 2nd)
 Placed Top 16 at Formula Drift Round 3, Palm Beach International Raceway, FL (Qualified 14th)
 Placed 4th at Formula Drift Round 4, The Wall, NJ (Qualified 1st)
 Placed Top 8 at Formula Drift Round 5, Evergreen Speedway, WA (Qualified 10th)
 Placed Top 8 at Formula Drift Round 6, Las Vegas Motor Speedway, NV (Qualified 13th)
 Placed Top 8 at Formula Drift Round 7, Irwindale Speedway, CA (Qualified 4th)

2010 
 Formula D Championship - 3rd Overall (515 pts)
 Placed Top 16 at Formula Drift Round 1, Streets of Long Beach, CA (Qualified 6th)
 Placed Top 8 at Formula Drift Round 2, Road Atlanta Raceway, GA (Qualified 2nd)
 Placed Top 8 at Formula Drift Round 3
 Placed Top 8 at Formula Drift Round 4, The Wall, NJ (Qualified 1st)
 Placed 2nd at Formula Drift Round 5, Evergreen Speedway, WA (Qualified 3rd)
 Placed Top 16 at Formula Drift Round 6, Las Vegas Motor Speedway, NV (Qualified 12th)
 Placed Top 16 at Formula Drift Round 7, Irwindale Speedway, CA (Qualified 4th)

2009 
 Formula D Championship - 2nd Overall (521 pts)
 Placed 1st at Formula Drift Round 1, Streets of Long Beach, CA (Qualified 10th)
 Placed 3rd at Formula Drift Round 2, Road Atlanta Raceway, GA (Qualified 9th)
 Placed Top 32 at Formula Drift Round 4, The Wall, NJ (Qualified 11th)
 Placed Top 8 at Formula Drift Round 5, Evergreen Speedway, WA (Qualified 1st)
 Placed Top 16 at Formula Drift Round 6, Las Vegas Motor Speedway, NV (Qualified 15th)
 Placed 1st at Formula Drift Round 7, Irwindale Speedway, CA (Qualified 2nd)

2008 
 Formula D Championship - 6th Overall (453 pts)
 Placed Top 8 at Formula Drift Round 1, Streets of Long Beach, CA
 Placed 3rd at Formula Drift Round 2, Road Atlanta Raceway, GA
 Placed Top 16 at Formula Drift Round 4, The Wall, NJ
 Placed Top 8 at Formula Drift Round 5, Evergreen Speedway, WA
 Placed 4th at Formula Drift Round 6, Las Vegas Motor Speedway, NV
 Placed Top 8 at Formula Drift Round 7, Irwindale Speedway, CA

2007 
 Formula D Championship - 15th Overall (228.50 pts)
 Placed Top 16 at Formula Drift Round 1, Streets of Long Beach, CA
 Placed Top 16 Formula Drift Round 2, Road Atlanta Raceway, GA
 Placed Top 16 at Formula Drift Round 3
 Placed Top 16 at Formula Drift Round 7, Irwindale Speedway, CA

References

1985 births
Living people
Drifting drivers
People from Derry, New Hampshire
Sportspeople from Rockingham County, New Hampshire